The Standard Works of the Church of Jesus Christ of Latter-day Saints (LDS Church, the largest in the Latter Day Saint movement) are the four books that currently constitute its open scriptural canon. The four books of the standard works are:
 The Authorized King James Version as the official scriptural text of the Bible (other versions of the Bible are used in non-English-speaking countries)
 The Book of Mormon, subtitled since 1981 "Another Testament of Jesus Christ"
 The Doctrine and Covenants (D&C)
 The Pearl of Great Price (containing the Book of Moses, the Book of Abraham, Joseph Smith–Matthew, Joseph Smith–History, and the Articles of Faith)

The Standard Works are printed and distributed by the LDS Church both in a single binding called a quadruple combination and as a set of two books, with the Bible in one binding, and the other three books in a second binding called a triple combination. Current editions of the Standard Works include a number of non-canonical study aids, including a Bible dictionary, photographs, maps and gazetteer, topical guide, index, footnotes, cross references, and excerpts from the Joseph Smith Translation of the Bible.

The scriptural canon is "open" due to the Latter-day Saint belief in continuous revelation. Additions can be made to the scriptural canon with the "common consent" of the church's membership. Other branches of the Latter Day Saint movement reject some of the Standard Works or add other scriptures, such as the Book of the Law of the Lord and The Word of the Lord Brought to Mankind by an Angel.

Differences in canonicity across sects

Canons of various Latter Day Saint denominations reject some of the Standard Works canonized by the LDS Church or have included additional works. For instance, the Bickertonite sect does not consider the Pearl of Great Price or Doctrine and Covenants to be scriptural. Rather, they believe that the New Testament scriptures contain a true description of the church as established by Jesus Christ, and that both the King James Version of the Bible and the Book of Mormon are the inspired word of God. Some Latter Day Saint denominations accept earlier versions of the Standard Works or work to develop corrected translations. Others have purportedly received additional revelations.

The Community of Christ points to Jesus Christ as the living Word of God, and it affirms the Bible, along with the Book of Mormon, as well as its own regularly appended version of Doctrines and Covenants as scripture for the church. While it publishes a version of the Joseph Smith Translation of the Bible—which includes material from the Book of Moses—the Community of Christ also accepts the use of other English translations of the Bible, such as the standard King James Version and the New Revised Standard Version.

Like the aforementioned Bickertonites, the Church of Christ (Temple Lot) rejects the Doctrine and Covenants and the Pearl of Great Price, as well as the Joseph Smith Translation of the Bible, preferring to use only the King James Bible and the Book of Mormon as doctrinal standards. The Book of Commandments is accepted as being superior to the Doctrine and Covenants as a compendium of Joseph Smith's early revelations, but is not accorded the same status as the Bible or the Book of Mormon.

The Word of the Lord and The Word of the Lord Brought to Mankind by an Angel are two related books considered to be scriptural by Fettingite factions that separated from the Temple Lot church. Both books contain revelations allegedly given to former Church of Christ (Temple Lot) Apostle Otto Fetting by an angelic being who claimed to be John the Baptist. The latter title (120 messages) contains the entirety of the former's material (30 msgs.) with additional revelations (90 msgs.) purportedly given to William A. Draves by this same being, after Fetting's death. Neither are accepted by the larger Temple Lot body of believers.

The Church of Jesus Christ of Latter Day Saints (Strangite) considers the Bible (when correctly translated), the Book of Mormon, and editions of the Doctrine and Covenants published prior to Joseph Smith's death (which contained the Lectures on Faith) to be inspired scripture. They also hold the Joseph Smith Translation of the Bible to be inspired, but do not believe modern publications of the text are accurate. Other portions of The Pearl of Great Price, however, are not considered to be scriptural—though are not necessarily fully rejected either. The Book of Jasher was consistently used by both Joseph Smith and James Strang, but as with other Latter Day Saint denominations and sects, there is no official stance on its authenticity, and it is not considered canonical.
This sect likewise holds as scriptural several prophecies, visions, revelations, and translations printed by James Strang, and published in the Revelations of James J. Strang.

An additional work called The Book of the Law of the Lord is also accepted as inspired scripture by the Strangites. They likewise hold as scriptural several prophecies, visions, revelations, and translations printed by James Strang, and published in the Revelations of James J. Strang. Among other things, this text contains his purported "Letter of Appointment" from Joseph Smith and his translation of the Voree plates.

The Church of Jesus Christ (Cutlerite) accepts the following as scripture: the Inspired Version of the Bible (including the Book of Moses and Joseph Smith–Matthew), the Book of Mormon, and the 1844 edition of the Doctrine and Covenants (including the Lectures on Faith). However, the revelation on tithing (section 107 in the 1844 edition; 119 in modern LDS editions) is emphatically rejected by members of this church, as it is not believed to be given by Joseph Smith. The Book of Abraham is rejected as scripture, as are the other portions of the Pearl of Great Price that do not appear in the Inspired Version of the Bible.

Many Latter Day Saint denominations have also either adopted the Articles of Faith or at least view them as a statement of basic theology. (They are considered scriptural by the larger LDS church and are included in The Pearl of Great Price.) At times, the Articles have been adapted to fit the respective belief systems of various faith communities.

Continuing revelation
Under the LDS Church's doctrine of continuing revelation, Latter-day Saints believe in the principle of revelation from God to his children. Individual members are entitled to divine revelation for confirmation of truths, gaining knowledge or wisdom, meeting personal challenges, and so forth. Parents are entitled to revelation for raising their families.

Church members believe that divine revelation for the direction of the entire church comes from God to the President of the Church, who they consider to be a prophet in the same sense as Noah, Abraham, Moses, Peter, and other biblical leaders. When other members of the First Presidency or Quorum of the Twelve speak as "moved upon by the Holy Ghost", it "shall be scripture, shall be the will of the Lord, shall be the mind of the Lord, shall be the word of the Lord, shall be the voice of the Lord, and the power of God unto salvation." Members are encouraged to ponder these revelations and pray to determine for themselves the truthfulness of doctrine.

Adding to the canon of scripture
The D&C teaches that "all things must be done in order, and by common consent in the church". This applies to adding new scripture. LDS Church president Harold B. Lee taught "The only one authorized to bring forth any new doctrine is the President of the Church, who, when he does, will declare it as revelation from God, and it will be so accepted by the Council of the Twelve and sustained by the body of the Church." There are several instances of this happening in the LDS Church:
June 9, 1830: First conference of the church, The Articles and Covenants of the Church of Christ, now known as D&C 20. If the Bible and Book of Mormon were not sustained on April 6 then they were by default when the Articles and Covenants were sustained. (see D&C 20:8-11)
August 17, 1835: Select revelations from Joseph Smith were unanimously accepted as scripture.  These were later printed in the D&C.
October 10, 1880: The Pearl of Great Price was unanimously accepted as scripture.  Also at that time, other revelations in the Doctrine and Covenants – which had not been accepted as scripture in 1835 because they were received after that date – were unanimously accepted as scripture.
October 6, 1890: Official Declaration 1 was accepted unanimously as scripture. It later began to be published in the Doctrine and Covenants.
April 3, 1976: Two visions (one received by Joseph Smith and the other by Joseph F. Smith) were accepted as scripture and added to the Pearl of Great Price. (The two visions were later moved to the D&C as sections 137 and 138.)
September 30, 1978: Official Declaration 2 was accepted unanimously as scripture. It immediately was added to the Doctrine and Covenants.

When a doctrine undergoes this procedure, the LDS Church treats it as the word of God, and it is used as a standard to compare other doctrines. Lee taught:
It is not to be thought that every word spoken by the General Authorities is inspired, or that they are moved upon by the Holy Ghost in everything they speak and write. Now you keep that in mind. I don't care what his position is, if he writes something or speaks something that goes beyond anything that you can find in the standard works, unless that one be the prophet, seer, and revelator—please note that one exception—you may immediately say, "Well, that is his own idea!" And if he says something that contradicts what is found in the standard works (I think that is why we call them "standard"—it is the standard measure of all that men teach), you may know by that same token that it is false; regardless of the position of the man who says it.

The Bible

English-speaking Latter-day Saints typically study a custom edition of the King James Version of the Bible (KJV), which includes custom chapter headings, footnotes referencing books in the Standard Works, and select passages from the Joseph Smith Translation of the Bible.

Though the KJV was always commonly used, it was officially adopted in the 1950s when J. Reuben Clark, of the church's First Presidency, argued extensively that newer translations, such as Revised Standard Version of 1952, were of lower quality and less compatible with LDS tradition.  After publishing its own KJV edition in 1979, the First Presidency announced in 1992 that the KJV was the church's official English Bible, stating "[w]hile other Bible versions may be easier to read than the King James Version, in doctrinal matters latter-day revelation supports the King James Version in preference to other English translations."  In 2010 this was written into the church's Handbook, which directs official church policy and programs.

A Spanish version, with a similar format and using a slightly revised version of the 1909 Reina-Valera translation, was published in 2009. Latter-day Saints in other non-English speaking areas may use other versions of the Bible.

Though the Bible is part of the LDS canon and members believe it to be the word of God, they believe that omissions and mistranslations are present in even the earliest known manuscripts. They claim that the errors in the Bible have led to incorrect interpretations of certain passages. Thus, as church founder Joseph Smith explained, the church believes the Bible to be the word of God "as far as it is translated correctly". The church teaches that "[t]he most reliable way to measure the accuracy of any biblical passage is not by comparing different texts, but by comparison with the Book of Mormon and modern-day revelations".

The manuscripts of the Joseph Smith Translation of the Bible state that "the Songs of Solomon are not inspired scripture," and therefore it is not included in LDS canon and rarely studied by members of the LDS Church. However, it is still printed in every version of the King James Bible published by the church.

The Apocrypha
Although the Apocrypha was part of the 1611 edition of the KJV, the LDS Church does not currently use the Apocrypha as part of its canon. Joseph Smith taught that while the contemporary edition of the Apocrypha was not to be relied on for doctrine, it was potentially useful when read with a spirit of discernment.

Joseph Smith Translation of the Bible

Joseph Smith translated selected verses of the Bible, working by subject. His complete work is known as the Joseph Smith Translation of the Bible, or the Inspired Version. Although this selected translation is not generally quoted by church members, the English Bible issued by the church and commonly used by Latter-day Saints contains cross-references to the Joseph Smith Translation (JST), as well as an appendix containing longer excerpts from it. Excerpts that were too long to include in the Bible appendix are included in the Pearl of Great Price as the Book of Moses (for Genesis 1:1-6:13) and Joseph Smith-Matthew (for Matthew 23:39-24:51 and Mark 13).

The Book of Mormon

Latter-day Saints consider the Book of Mormon a volume of holy scripture comparable to the Bible. It contains a record of God's dealings with the prophets and ancient inhabitants of the Americas. The introduction to the book asserts that it "contains, as does the Bible, the fullness of the everlasting gospel. The book was written by many ancient prophets by the spirit of prophecy and revelation. Their words, written on gold plates, were quoted and abridged by a prophet-historian named Mormon."

Segments of the Book of Mormon provide an account of the culture, religious teachings, and civilizations of some of the groups who immigrated to the New World. One came from Jerusalem in 600 B.C., and afterward separated into two nations, identified in the book as the Nephites and the Lamanites. Some years after their arrival, the Nephites met with a similar group, the Mulekites who left the Middle East during the same period. An older group arrived in America much earlier, when the Lord confounded the tongues at the Tower of Babel. This group is known as the Jaredites and their story is condensed in the Book of Ether. The crowning event recorded in the Book of Mormon is the personal ministry of Jesus Christ among Nephites soon after his resurrection. This account presents the doctrines of the gospel, outlines the plan of salvation, and offers men peace in this life and eternal salvation in the life to come.  The latter segments of the Book of Mormon detail the destruction of these civilizations, as all were destroyed except the Lamanites. The book asserts that the Lamanites are among the ancestors of the indigenous peoples of the Americas.

According to his record, Joseph Smith translated the Book of Mormon by gift and power of God through a set of interpreters later referred to as the Urim and Thummim. Eleven witnesses signed testimonies of its authenticity, which are now included in the preface to the Book of Mormon. The Three Witnesses testified to have seen an angel present the gold plates and to have heard God bear witness to its truth. Eight others stated that Joseph Smith showed them the plates and that they handled and examined them.

The Doctrine and Covenants

The church's D&C is a collection of revelations, policies, letters, and statements given to the modern church by past church presidents. This record contains points of church doctrine and direction on church government. The book has existed in numerous forms, with varying content, throughout the history of the church and has also been published in differing formats by the various Latter Day Saint denominations. When the church chooses to canonize new material, it is typically added to the Doctrine and Covenants; the most recent changes were made in 1981.

The Pearl of Great Price

The Pearl of Great Price is a selection of material produced by Joseph Smith and deals with many significant aspects of the faith and doctrine of the church.  Many of these materials were initially published in church periodicals in the early days of the church.

The Pearl of Great Price contains five sections:
 Selections from the Book of Moses:  portions of the Book of Genesis from the Joseph Smith Translation of the Bible.
 The Book of Abraham: a translation from papyri acquired by Smith in 1835, dealing with Abraham's journeys in Egypt.  The work contains many distinctive Mormon doctrines such as exaltation.
 Joseph Smith–Matthew: portions of the Gospel of Matthew and Gospel of Mark from the Joseph Smith Translation of the Bible.
 Joseph Smith–History: a first-person narrative of Smith's life before the founding of the church. The material is taken from Documentary History of the Church and is based on a history written by Smith in 1838.
 The Articles of Faith: concise listing of thirteen fundamental doctrines of Mormonism composed by Smith in 1842.

Church instruction
Historically, in the church's Sunday School and Church Educational System (CES) classes, the standard works have been studied and taught in a four-year rotation:

Year One: Old Testament (also includes some coverage of related topics in the Book of Moses and Book of Abraham from the Pearl of Great Price)
Year Two: New Testament
Year Three: Book of Mormon
Year Four: Doctrine and Covenants and Church History

However, church leaders have emphasized that members should not restrict their study of the standard works to the particular book being currently studied in Sunday School or other religious courses. Specifically, church president Ezra Taft Benson taught:

At present, the Book of Mormon is studied in our Sunday School and seminary classes every fourth year. This four-year pattern, however, must not be followed by Church members in their personal and family study. We need to read daily from the pages of [that] book ....

In November 2014, the church announced changes in the curriculum to be used within CES, including the church's four institutions of higher education, such as Brigham Young University.  The church's seminary program will retain the current four-year rotation of study.  Beginning in the fall of 2015, incoming institute of religion and CES higher education students will be required to take four new cornerstone courses:

Jesus Christ and the Everlasting Gospel
Foundations of the Restoration
The Teachings and Doctrine of the Book of Mormon
The Eternal Family

The church's intent is to further integrate the teachings found in the Standard Works with that of church leaders and other current sources.

See also
 Book of Joseph, untranslated scripture from Joseph Smith Papyri
 Kinderhook plates, incomplete non-canonized translation made by Joseph Smith
 Lectures on Faith, decanonized in 1921
 List of non-canonical revelations in The Church of Jesus Christ of Latter-day Saints

References

External links
Quadruple Combination: Official Edition of the Standard Works (King James Bible, the Book of Mormon, Doctrine and Covenants, and Pearl of Great Price) in PDF format, including footnotes, chapter headings and supplemental material.
Official Edition of the LDS standard works with cross references and study helps

 
Latter Day Saint terms